Lars Eric Anderson (born September 25, 1987) is an American former professional baseball first baseman. He played for the Boston Red Sox of Major League Baseball (MLB) from 2010 through 2012.

High school
Anderson attended Jesuit High School in Sacramento, California. In his senior season he hit over .400 with 14 home runs in 29 games. He committed to attend the University of California, Berkeley on a scholarship that would allow him to play college baseball for the California Golden Bears baseball team.

Draft
Coming into the 2006 Major League Baseball Draft, Anderson was considered an early round talent, but dropped to the 18th round due to signability issues. He agreed to an $825,000 signing bonus with the Red Sox, equivalent to the suggested bonus for a first round supplemental pick.

Professional career

Boston Red Sox
He made his professional debut in April 2007 with the Greenville Drive.  "He really understands the strike zone well, and he recognizes balls and strikes early," said Gabe Kapler, the former Sox outfielder who was Anderson's manager at Greenville.  "[H]e was way ahead of the game because he was already recognizing balls and strikes and had a plan, an approach at the plate that was advanced.  He had planned on not swinging at breaking balls until he had two strikes on him."

In September 2008, Anderson was named the Minor League Offensive Player of the Year for the Red Sox, following a season of a combined 18 home runs and 80 runs batted in while hitting over .300 for both the Lancaster JetHawks and Portland Sea Dogs.

In 2009, his first full season at AA Portland, Anderson struggled, batting just .233 with 9 home runs and 51 RBI.

Anderson started the 2010 season with the Sea Dogs. He was promoted to the AAA Pawtucket Red Sox on April 29 after hitting .355 with five home runs and 15 RBIs in 17 games in Portland, and batted .262 with 10 home runs and 53 RBIs in 113 games.

Despite making his major league debut in September 2010, Anderson returned to Pawtucket for the 2011 season and batted .265 with 14 home runs and 78 RBIs. On July 30, 2011, Anderson was nearly traded to his hometown Oakland Athletics, along with a player to be named later for starting pitcher Rich Harden.  However, the deal fell through, with the Red Sox citing issues with Harden's health.

Anderson made his major league debut with Red Sox on September 6, 2010. He then replaced Mike Lowell at first base in the 5th inning of Lowell's last major league game on October 2, 2010, designated "Mike Lowell Day" by the Red Sox. In 18 appearances Anderson had 7 hits in 35 at-bats, with 4 RBIs.

Anderson appeared in 6 games in September 2011 as a defensive replacement and pinch runner, scoring twice as a pinch runner.

On April 23, 2012, Anderson was again called up to the majors after Jason Repko was placed on the 15-day disabled list.

Arizona Diamondbacks
The Red Sox traded Anderson to the Cleveland Indians for Steven Wright on July 31, 2012. On December 11, 2012, the Indians traded Anderson to the Arizona Diamondbacks in a three-team trade.

Chicago White Sox
The Diamondbacks designated Anderson for assignment on January 24, 2013. He was claimed off waivers by the Chicago White Sox, and placed on their 40-man roster on February 1. After being designated for assignment by the White Sox, Anderson was claimed by the Toronto Blue Jays on February 25.  Anderson was designated for assignment by the Blue Jays on March 29, 2013. After clearing waivers, Anderson was traded by the Blue Jays to the Chicago White Sox for cash on April 1. Anderson was assigned to the White Sox Triple-A affiliate Charlotte Knights.

On July 18, 2013, Anderson was released from the Minors.

Chicago Cubs
On January 24, 2014, he signed a minor league contract with the Chicago Cubs.

Los Angeles Dodgers
In December 2014, he signed a minor league contract with the Los Angeles Dodgers and was assigned to the AA Tulsa Drillers to start the season. He appeared in 130 games for the Drillers and also three games for the triple-A Oklahoma City Dodgers. He hit .242 with 14 homers and 65 RBI. In 2016, he appeared in 8 games for Oklahoma City and 88 games for Tulsa, and hit .266 with 8 homers and 48 RBI.

Kōchi Fighting Dogs 
In March 2017, Anderson joined the Kōchi Fighting Dogs of the Shikoku Island League Plus independent league.

Sydney Blue Sox
Anderson signed with the Sydney Blue Sox of the Australian Baseball League for the 2017/18 season.

Solingen Alligators
In March 2018, Anderson signed with the Solingen Alligators of the Baseball Bundesliga, Germany's premier baseball league. He became a free agent following the season. He retired in the offseason.

Personal life
Anderson is a co-owner of Birdman Bats along with former Red Sox teammate Ryan Kalish. Anderson has been an owner of Birdman Bats since 2016.

References

External links

1987 births
Living people
American expatriate baseball players in Japan
Baseball players from Oakland, California
Boston Red Sox players
Charlotte Knights players
Columbus Clippers players
Greenville Drive players
Iowa Cubs players
Kōchi Fighting Dogs players
Lancaster JetHawks players
Oklahoma City Dodgers players
Pawtucket Red Sox players
Portland Sea Dogs players
Sydney Blue Sox players
Tennessee Smokies players
Tulsa Drillers players
American expatriate baseball players in Australia
American expatriate baseball players in Germany